was a lawmaker and a member of the Liberal Democratic Party (LDP). He served as director general of the now-defunct defense agency of Japan in 1990.

Career
Ishikawa was a member of the LDP. He was part of the group headed by Yōhei Kōno in the party. He served at the House of Representatives.

In 1983, Ishikawa was parliamentary vice minister for foreign affairs. In 1984, he served as the chairman of LDP's diplomacy committee. On 28 February 1990 he was appointed defense minister in the cabinet led by Prime Minister Toshiki Kaifu, replacing Juro Matsumoto in the post. Ishikawa's tenure was very brief and on 29 December of the same year he was replaced by Yukihiko Ikeda in the post. After that, Ishikawa led the LDP's Tokyo chapter.

Ishikawa died on 21 June 2014 from acute respiratory failure after being hospitalized with pneumonia.

References

20th-century Japanese politicians
1925 births
2014 deaths
Deaths from pneumonia in Japan
Deaths from respiratory failure
Japanese defense ministers
Liberal Democratic Party (Japan) politicians
Members of the House of Representatives (Japan)